Jerry Brien was an Australian rugby league footballer and coach. He played for Western Suburbs, St. George and for the New South Wales Rugby League team. He also coached the Canterbury-Bankstown club and Western Suburbs.

Playing career
In 1925, Brien was chosen to play for New South Wales although he was only playing for the Western Suburbs reserve grade team, and had played just a handful of first grade games since his debut in 1923.

Brien represented NSW again in 1928, and was selected to represent Australia in the second test against England, but an injury suffered playing for Wests stopped him from making his international debut.

After six seasons with Western Suburbs, Brien joined St. George for 4 games in 1929.

Coaching career
After his retirement as a player,  Brien began coaching, including stints with South Grafton in 1932  & Cowra in 1933. In 1937, Brien returned to coach Western Suburbs for the eight games of the shortened season where they finished second last. In 1939, he took over as coach at Canterbury-Bankstown for a season, and returned to be at the helm when they won their second premiership in 1942.

By 1947, Brien was NSW coach and one of their selectors. Later, he became an Australian selector, but was dropped as a NSW selector in March 1951, making him ineligible to fill the national role.

References

1900 births
1962 deaths
Australian rugby league coaches
Australian rugby league players
Canterbury-Bankstown Bulldogs coaches
City New South Wales rugby league team players
Date of birth missing
Date of death missing
New South Wales rugby league team coaches
New South Wales rugby league team players
Rugby league halfbacks
Rugby league players from Sydney
St. George Dragons players
Western Suburbs Magpies coaches
Western Suburbs Magpies players